Mary East (approx 1716 — 8 June 1780) was an English tavern owner in the East End of London in the 1700s and is best known for being assigned female at birth but openly presenting as male in the Georgian era.

In 1732, a 16-year-old Mary East began to present as a man, taking on the name James How after entering a relationship with another 17-year-old female friend (unnamed).

Life as a pub landlord

The two identified as a married couple and went on to purchase and run several pubs across East London before settling in Poplar to run the White Horse pub in 1745.

Court case

The couple lived peacefully but experienced incidents of blackmail from confidants and old acquaintances wanting to expose James How's past female identity. Around 1750, a person who knew of Mary East in her youth blackmailed the couple for cash in exchange for keeping their secret. James How complied with the payments of between £5 and £10 until 1765 when Mrs. How passed away.

In 1766, unable to comply with the demands any further and after a violent assault on James How from the blackmailer, James How brought the matter to the court. The extortionist appeared before Justices of the Peace in Whitechapel and "after the strongest proof of their extortion and assault" was detained in Clerkenwell Bridewell prison until trial. James How outed the original identity and attended the trial hearings as Mary East. Mary was able to prove the extortion of considerable sums of money as well as assault, and won the case. The blackmailer was convicted and sentenced to stand three times in the pillory and four years of imprisonment. Mary had to resign from the roles she had held as James How, and had to retire from the White Horse.

After the hearing, Mary East retired and lived the remaining years of her life as a woman. She died on 8 June 1780; her estate was divided between the poor of Poplar, relatives, and friends. She was buried at St Matthias Old Church in Poplar.

In popular culture

The story of James How and his wife was told in Bram Stoker’s novel Famous Impostors in 1910.

References 

18th-century English people
English transgender people
1730s births
1780 deaths